Los Palacios Municipal Museum is a museum located in the 21st street Los Palacios, Cuba. In this building lived Enrique Troncoso, a Cuban revolutionary. It was established as a museum on 30 December 1980.

The museum holds several collections on history, numismatics, local publications and weapons.

See also 
 List of museums in Cuba

References 

Museums in Cuba
Buildings and structures in Pinar del Río Province
Museums established in 1980
1980 establishments in Cuba
20th-century architecture in Cuba